Higman is a surname. Notable people with the surname include:

Donald G. Higman (1928–2006), American mathematician
Graham Higman (1917–2008), British mathematician
Howard Higman (1915–1995), American sociologist
John Philips Higman (1793–1955), English mathematician and Anglican rector